The Stuff That Dreams Are Made Of is a 1972 West German thriller film directed by Alfred Vohrer and starring Edith Heerdegen, Hannelore Elsner and Herbert Fleischmann.

Cast

References

Bibliography 
 Bock, Hans-Michael & Bergfelder, Tim. The Concise CineGraph. Encyclopedia of German Cinema. Berghahn Books, 2009.

External links 
 

1972 films
1970s thriller films
German thriller films
West German films
1970s German-language films
Films directed by Alfred Vohrer
Constantin Film films
Films about journalists
Cold War spy films
Films based on Austrian novels
1970s German films